Textures is a 1989 album by the British musician Brian Eno consisting of edited and unedited ambient music, produced exclusively for licensed use in television programs and films. The album was not commercially released to the public.

Track listing
"Soft Dawn"  – 2:19
"The Water Garden"  – 2:53
"Shaded Water"  – 3:16
"Suspicious"  – 4:14
"Ozone"  – 1:42
"Landscape with Haze"  – 4:06
"Mirage"  – 3:20
"River Mist"  – 4:33
"Constant Dreams"  – 3:57
"Dark Dreams"  – 3:07
"Black Planet"  – 2:52
"Night Thoughts"  – 3:37
"Travellers"  – 3:52
"Evil Thoughts"  – 2:01
"Darkness"  – 1:24
"Jungles"  – 2:00
"Sanctuaries"  – 1:37
"Menace"  – 1:46
"Suspended Motion"  – 3:43
"The Wild"  – 4:22
"River Journey"  – 11:14

While eleven tracks remain unpublished, seven tracks are actually edits or versions of pieces released in 1992 on The Shutov Assembly, two tracks are versions of "Asian River" previously released on Music for Films III (1988), and "Constant Dreams" is a short clip of Neroli, released as an hour long single track album in 1993.
 "The Water Garden" = "Cavallino"
 "Shaded Water" = "Alhondiga"
 "Suspicions" = "Lanzarote"
 "Landscape with Haze" = "Riverside"
 "Mirage" = "Triennale"
 "River Mist" = "Asian River"
 "Constant Dreams" = "Neroli" (edit) 
 "Suspended Motion" = "Markgraph" 
 "The Wild" = "Stedelijk"
 "River Journey" = "Asian River" (extended alternate mix)

Credits
 Tracks 1, 2, 4-11, 18-21 composed by Brian Eno
 Tracks 3, 12, 13 composed by Brian Eno/Roger Eno
 Tracks 14-17 composed by Brian Eno/Daniel Lanois

Brian Eno albums
1989 albums
Production music